North Lake or North Lakes may refer to:

Communities

Australia
North Lake, Western Australia, a suburb and a namesake lake within the area
North Lakes, Queensland, an outer suburb north of Brisbane

Canada
North Lake Parish, New Brunswick
North Lake, Prince Edward Island

United States
North Lake, Pasadena, California, in Los Angeles County
North Lake, Wisconsin, in Waukesha County

Lakes
North Lake (Crittenden County, Arkansas), Crittenden County, Arkansas
North Lake (Fulton County, Arkansas), Fulton County, Arkansas
North Lake (California), Inyo County, California
North Lake (Goodhue County, Minnesota), Goodhue County, Minnesota
North Lake (Martin County, Minnesota), Martin County, Minnesota
North Lake (New York)
North Lake (Dallas), Texas
North Lake (Red River County, Texas) (also called Country Club Lake)
North Lake (Nova Scotia), in Antigonish County
North Lake (Western Australia)

Education
North Lake Senior Campus, in Kardinya, Western Australia
North Lake College, in Texas
North Lake School, in Oregon

Rail transport
North Lake Station, a former railway station in Ontario
North Lake College (DART station), a light rail station in Irving, Texas
North Lake Line, a former local rail line in Pasadena, California

See also
Northlake (disambiguation)
North–South Lake, in New York state